Newton Burgoland Marshes is an  biological Site of Special Scientific Interest east of Newton Burgoland in Leicestershire.

This site is in two areas, with the northern one having wet grassland and species rich marsh, while the southern one is well-drained grassland. Herbs in the marsh include ragged robin, marsh marigold, meadow thistle and southern marsh orchid.

The site is private land with no public access.

References

Sites of Special Scientific Interest in Leicestershire
Shackerstone